236 (two hundred [and] thirty-six) is the natural number following 235 and preceding 237.

236 is a happy number.

There are 236 different connected graphs with eight vertices and nine edges, and 236 different degree sequences of six-vertex graphs.

There are 236 possible different phylogenetic trees representing the history of evolutionary divergences among five species.

References

Integers